Henryk Sylwester Cegielski (31 December 1945 – 4 February 2015) was a Polish basketball player. He competed in the men's tournament at the 1968 Summer Olympics.

References

External links
 

1945 births
2015 deaths
Polish men's basketball players
1967 FIBA World Championship players
Olympic basketball players of Poland
Basketball players at the 1968 Summer Olympics
People from Leszno
Sportspeople from Greater Poland Voivodeship
Lech Poznań (basketball) players